Ali Demić (born October 13, 1991) is a Bosnian professional basketball player.

Standing at 6 ft 8 (2.03m) and weighing 212 lb (96 kg), he has started at the small forward and power forward positions.

Career achievements
 Bosnian League champion: 1  (with Zrinjski: 2017–18)

References

External links
Kosarka portal

1991 births
Living people
Bosnia and Herzegovina men's basketball players
Bosniaks of Bosnia and Herzegovina
Basketball players from Mostar
Forwards (basketball)